iBooks may refer to:

 iBooks, the former name of Apple Books.
 ibooks Inc., a book and comics publishing company founded by Byron Preiss.